Diplacus rattanii is a species of monkeyflower known by the common name Rattan's monkeyflower.

Distribution
It is endemic to California, where it is known from the North and Central Coast Ranges. It grows in open and disturbed habitat types, such as rock outcrops and areas recently cleared by wildfire.

Description
Diplacus rattanii is an annual herb growing 1 to 18 centimeters tall. The oppositely arranged oval leaves are up to 4.6 centimeters long, the newer ones hairy in texture. The flower is no more than a centimeter long, its tubular base encapsulated in a swollen, ribbed calyx of hairy sepals. The flower is magenta in color, often with yellow markings in the mouth.

References

External links
Jepson Manual Treatment - Mimulus rattanii
USDA Plants Profile: Mimulus rattanii
Mimulus rattanii - Photo gallery

rattanii
Endemic flora of California
Natural history of the California chaparral and woodlands
Natural history of the California Coast Ranges
Natural history of the San Francisco Bay Area
Flora without expected TNC conservation status